D3Energy is a developer of floating solar panels in the United States. The company provides service, sales, installation & maintenance.

History

In 2013, D3Energy entered into a partnership with the French company Ciel & Terre to develop and distribute floating solar across the United States, predominantly in states like Florida and New Jersey. Ciel & Terre have been developing large-scale solar power plants for commercial, government & non-profit institutions since 2006.  Since 2011 they have provided innovative floating solar solutions.

Services

D3Energy provides services such as Engineering, Project Development, Operations and Maintenance, Financing, Procurement & Construction, and Hydrelio distribution.

Engineering
 Floating Solar design
 R&D innovation
 Anchoring systems
 Electrical design
 Environmental impact
 Industrial & quality process

Project Development
 Feasibility study
 Financial viability
 Tender procurement process
 Planning
 Grid-connection application
 FIT advice & application
 Overall project coordination

Operations and Maintenance
 Asset management
 Monitoring & reporting
 Preventative maintenance
 Corrective maintenance
 Curative maintenance

Financing
 Lease agreement
 Third-party financing
 Direct investment capabilities
 Due diligence services

Procurement & Construction
 On-site training
 Production
 Sourcing
 Project management
 Installation
 Commissioning

Hydrelio Distribution
 Manufacturing lines in 7 countries, on 4 continents

Projects
On February 18, 2017, Ciel & Terre and D3 Energy installed a 31.5 kWp floating array in Central Florida. The project is the first in partnership with the Orlando Utilities Commission (OUC) and the largest floating solar photovoltaic system in Florida to date.

References

Electric power companies of the United States
Companies based in Miami-Dade County, Florida
Energy companies established in 2013
Renewable resource companies established in 2013
2013 establishments in Florida
American companies established in 2013
Renewable energy companies of the United States